Obafela “Fela” Bank-Olemoh also known as FBO (born December 31, 1973) is an entrepreneur, strategist, and public speaker and serves as the Senior Special Assistant on Education Interventions to the President of Nigeria, Muhammadu Buhari since September, 2019.

Family 
Fela Bank Olemoh (FBO) was born into the Bank-Olemoh and Bajulaiye families of Lagos on 31 December 1973 in Lagos State. FBO is married to Jumoke (née Falaiye) Bank-Olemoh. They have three children: two daughters, Anjola and Ebun, and a son, Nifemi.

Education 
FBO attended Government College, Lagos, from 1984 to 1989. Thereafter, he studied for his undergraduate degree at Obafemi Awolowo University, Ile-Ife (91/92 Set) where he obtained a Bachelor of Science (B.Sc.) degree in accounting in 1998. FBO later participated in the OMP Entrepreneur programme at the Lagos Business School of Pan-Atlantic University in 2007 to deepen and entrench his entrepreneurial orientation. He is also an alumnus of the Business School Netherlands (BSN), with a master's degree in business administration (2012).

Career 
In October 1998, FBO kicked off his career as a graduate trainee at SystemSpecs Limited and rose to become Senior Manager (International Sales) before he resigned and co-founded MediaVision Limited in 2003. FBO led MediaVision as chief executive officer until 2015, when he assumed public office.

Political career 
FBO served as the Special Adviser on Education to the Governor of Lagos State, under the mandate of His Excellency, Governor Akinwunmi Ambode (2015 to 2019), where he spearheaded the implementation of several human capacity development initiatives including ReadySetWork (RSW), CodeLagos, Eko Nke Koo (Lagos is Learning) and many more.

In September 2019, he was appointed as Senior Special Assistant to the President of the Federal Republic of Nigeria on Education Interventions. In his position as SSA on Education Interventions, he is actively involved in facilitating Generation Unlimited Nigeria (Gen U Nigeria), a United Nations endorsed intervention that aims to reach 20 million young Nigerians aged 10–24 years by 2030 with Education, Skills Training, Employment, Entrepreneurship and Empowerment. 
He is also working with states to mainstream EdTech solutions into our country's primary, secondary and tertiary institutions. His recent engagements with the private sector on the implementation of a TVET Intervention to solve our TVET challenges in the country is worthy of note.

Most recently, he was appointed by the President to the Governing Board of the newly inaugurated National Senior Secondary Education Commission (NSSEC), a body established to set standards that would ensure effective teaching and learning at the Senior Secondary School level of our Education System. 

He is a member of the recently inaugurated Technical Working Groups on National Poverty Reduction with Growth Strategy (NPRGS) - A National Strategy to reduce unemployment and lift 100 million Nigerians out of Poverty by 2030.

Awards 
 Lagos State Merit Award, 2014
 RSW - Best Education Intervention, 2017
 Code Lagos, 2019
 Best Education Personality, 2019

Publications

Articles 
As a columnist, FBO has written and published numerous Leadership, Educational and Motivational articles on NaijaTimes, theCable.ng & his blog

90secondswithFBO Weekly Videos 
Every week, across all his social media platforms, FBO shares his video series titled 90secondswithFBO, a 90-second video on Leadership and Life generally.

External links 
 Official Website

References 

1973 births
Living people
Nigerian educational theorists
All Progressives Congress politicians